Verticordia inclusa  is a species of flowering plant in the myrtle family, Myrtaceae and is endemic to the south-west of Western Australia. It is a small shrub with small, thick leaves and groups of scented, mostly white to pale pink flowers with a red centre on the ends of the branches in spring.

Description
Leaves near the flowers tend to be smaller

Taxonomy and naming
Verticordia inclusa was first formally described by Alex George in 1991 and the description was published in Nuytsia from specimens found near Ravensthorpe by Alex and Elizabeth George. The specific epithet (inclusa) is a Latin word meaning "enclosed" or "confined" referring to the stamens and style being enclosed by the petals.

When Alex George reviewed the genus in 1991, he placed this species in subgenus Verticordia, section Catocalypta along with V. roei, V. apecta, V. insignis, V. habrantha, V. lehmannii and V. pritzelii.

Distribution and habitat
This verticordia usually grows in sand, often with or over gravel, loam or clay, frequently with other species of verticordia, in heath and shrubland. It occurs in the area between Esperance and the Fitzgerald River National Park and as far north as Moorine Rock and Coolgardie in the Avon Wheatbelt, Coolgardie, Esperance Plains, Mallee biogeographic regions.

Conservation
Verticordia inclusa is classified as "not threatened" by the Western Australian Government Department of Parks and Wildlife.

Use in horticulture
To date this verticordia has been not been successfully propagated or established in horticulture.

References

inclusa
Rosids of Western Australia
Eudicots of Western Australia
Plants described in 1991